was an officer and ace fighter pilot in the Imperial Japanese Navy (IJN) during the Second Sino-Japanese War and the Pacific theater of World War II.  Matsuba was officially credited with destroying a total of 18 enemy aircraft in aerial combat.

Akio Matsuba was stationed aboard the fleet aircraft carrier Kaga on the very first day of combat operations in the Second Sino-Japanese War-Second World War at the Battle of Shanghai, and flying an A2N in his very first combat mission in support of Japanese troop-landings in Shanghai on 16 August 1937, Matsuba would share in the shooting down of a Chinese Air Force Douglas O-2M, the first kill of many kills to come for him as the war eventually expanded into the Pacific War. He would claim six F6F Hellcats from Task Force 58 shot-down in two days of battles fought over Iwo Jima on 03 and 04 July 1944, half-a-year before the official Battle of Iwo Jima.

References

1914 births
Year of death missing
Japanese naval aviators
Japanese World War II flying aces
People from Mie Prefecture
Imperial Japanese Navy officers